The British Rail Class 117 diesel multiple units (DMUs) were built by Pressed Steel from 1959 to 1961. It was a licence-built variant of the British Rail Class 116.

Original work
A total of 123 Class 117 cars were built by Pressed Steel between 1959 and 1961, delivered as 39 three-car units plus three pairs of spare motor coaches. The Class 116 was ordered in large numbers  which Derby Works could not fulfil, so the work was sub contracted. When first introduced in 1960, these three-car units were all based with the similar Class 121 single carriage (railcar) units on British Railways Western Region for suburban work out of London Paddington. The units were largely based at Reading and Southall depots. The units remained here for many years working these services.

The type was used for a railtour from Paddington to the south west on 31 May 1969.

Later operations
In the 1980s, expiry of other DMUs facilitated moves for some units from the Western Region to Birmingham, as below, and Scotland, prior to the delivery of new units to replace them. They were given refurbishments.

The first shake up in ownership occurred in the late 1980s, when the Scottish, Welsh, Cornish and Birmingham based units were transferred to Provincial Services, later Regional Railways, in the sectorisation of British Rail, while the Southall-based units transferred to Network SouthEast. The Regional Railways units were refurbished at Tyseley Locomotive Works.

In the early 1990s, several units were named: 701 (51350/92) was named 'Marston Vale' and 705 (51358/400) was 'Leslie Crabbe'.

They were replaced on the lines out of Paddington when the Class 165/1 'Network Turbo' units came into service by 28 November 1992.

They soldiered on in the former Western Region until replaced by Class 150 and Class 153 DMUs by 21 May 1993, although the type could be found running Penzance - Looe services until 1997. An attempt was made to remove them from Cornish work using Class 142 "Skipper/Pacer" units, but these fixed wheelbase units proved to be a liability on the tight Cornish branchline curves, increasing rail and wheel wear, moving to the North of England instead. They were finally replaced with the advent of more Class 150s and Class 153s freed up from other areas.

The type was used in Scotland between Edinburgh - Perth, Cowdenbeath and Markinch using the Forth Bridge and continued to work in Scotland until 12 January 1998, where they were replaced with Class 156s. The final day of 117s running in Scotland was 27 November 1999.

For many years, passenger services on the Birmingham Cross-City Line were worked by Class 117, along with Class 115, 116, 118 and 121 diesel multiple units, but all were withdrawn from service by 1995.

In 2000, Class 150 Sprinter units replaced the Class 117 units on Silverlink, finally bringing to an end decades of service on Britain's rail network in front line service.

Once in preservation it has since been discovered that the units had all sorts of Leyland 680 engine variants.. For example, one unit was noted as having a Leyland 680/1 (150 BHP)  and a Leyland 680-1595  (180 BHP) .

Gallery

Preservation
Due to the type's longevity, 12 units have been preserved on heritage railways.

References

The Railcar Association
Motive Power Recognition: 3 DMUs. Colin J. Marsden
British Railway Pictorial: First Generation DMUs.  Kevin Robertson
British Rail Fleet Survey 8: Diesel Multiple Units- The First Generation.  Brian Haresnape
A Pictorial Record of British Railways Diesel Multiple Units.  Brian Golding

117
Pressed Steel Company multiple units
Train-related introductions in 1959